Everett McGill (born Charles Everett McGill III, October 21, 1945) is a former American actor, who rose to prominence for his portrayal of a caveman in Quest for Fire (1981). He went on to have prominent roles in the films Dune (1984), Silver Bullet (1985), Heartbreak Ridge (1986), Licence to Kill (1989), The People Under the Stairs (1991) and Under Siege 2: Dark Territory (1995).

On television he appeared as "Big" Ed Hurley in Twin Peaks (1990–1991). He retired from acting in 1999, but returned for the revival of Twin Peaks.

Early life
McGill was born Everett Charles McGill III in Miami Beach, Florida. He graduated from Rosedale High School in Kansas City, Kansas, in 1963.

Career
McGill has a relatively short filmography and has made something of a career of playing sadistic military types or terrorists. He managed to garner some level of fame by appearing in films such as Brubaker starring Robert Redford. McGill's roles include Chad Richards on the soap opera The Guiding Light in 1975 and 1976. After coming into the public eye in 1981 for his role as the rugged caveman leader Naoh in Quest for Fire, McGill appeared in Silver Bullet, a 1985 werewolf film inspired by a Stephen King short story; the Korean War battle epic Field of Honor and the Clint Eastwood war film Heartbreak Ridge in 1986; and in the 1989 installment of the James Bond franchise Licence to Kill. In 1988, McGill played the titular role in Iguana directed by Monte Hellman. In 1990-91, he appeared in the television series Twin Peaks. In 1991, McGill reunited with his Twin Peaks co-star Wendy Robie; the two appeared as the villains of the Wes Craven feature The People Under the Stairs. In 1996, he starred in the film My Fellow Americans with his co-stars James Garner and Jack Lemmon.

He has worked on a number of occasions with director David Lynch. McGill first worked with Lynch in the 1984 adaptation of Frank Herbert's Dune, in which he played Fremen leader Stilgar. McGill later appeared as Ed Hurley on Lynch’s television series Twin Peaks. McGill also appeared in Lynch's 1999 film The Straight Story.

After Lynch searched for him in his country home, the actor and director reunited, and McGill decided to come out of retirement specifically to reprise the role of Big Ed Hurley, in the 2017 revival of Twin Peaks.

Filmography
 Yanks (1979) as White G.I. at dance
 Union City (1980) as Larry Longacre
 Brubaker (1980) as Eddie Caldwell
 Quest for Fire (1981) as Naoh
 Dune (1984) as Stilgar
 Silver Bullet (1985) as Reverend Lester Lowe
 Field of Honor (1986) as Sergeant "Sire" De Koning
 Heartbreak Ridge (1986) as Major Malcolm Powers
 Iguana (1988) as Oberlus
 Licence to Kill (1989) as Ed Killifer
 Jezebel's Kiss (1990) as Sheriff Dan Riley
 Twin Peaks (1990–1991/2017) as Big Ed Hurley
 The People Under the Stairs (1991) as Eldon "Daddy" Robeson
 Under Siege 2: Dark Territory (1995) as Marcus Penn
 My Fellow Americans (1996) as Col. Paul Tanner
 Jekyll Island (1998) as Dalton Bradford
 The Straight Story (1999) as Tom the John Deere Dealer

References

External links

1945 births
American male film actors
American male television actors
Living people
Male actors from Miami
20th-century American male actors
21st-century American male actors
American male soap opera actors